Shrimati Savitri Thakur is politician from Dhar and belong to Bhartiya Janata Party (BJP).

She contested 2014 Lok Sabha elections from Dhar seat in Madhya Pradesh.

References

Living people
People from Dhar district
India MPs 2014–2019
Lok Sabha members from Madhya Pradesh
Women in Madhya Pradesh politics
Bharatiya Janata Party politicians from Madhya Pradesh
21st-century Indian women politicians
21st-century Indian politicians
1978 births